Sergeant First Class Modesto Cartagena (July 21, 1921 – March 2, 2010) was a member of the United States Army who served in the 65th Infantry Regiment, a military regiment consisting of Puerto Rican enlisted soldiers and officers from the continental United States also known as "The Borinqueneers," during World War II and the Korean War, becoming the most decorated Hispanic soldier in that war. He was the most decorated Puerto Rican soldier in history.

Early years
Cartagena (birth name: Modesto Cartagena de Jesús ) was born in a poor family, and raised in the mountains of Cayey, Puerto Rico during the Great Depression.  Cartagena enlisted in the U.S. Army in San Juan, Puerto Rico and was assigned to the 65th Infantry, also known as The Borinqueneers because, with the exception of the officer staff, it was made up of Puerto Rican enlisted men. During World War II he served in units guarding military installations in the Caribbean and later in the Allied occupation of Germany. Cartagena was discharged after the 65th Infantry Regiment returned to Puerto Rico.

Korean War

Upon the outbreak of the Korean War, Cartagena reenlisted and entered the Army with the rank of Sergeant. He was assigned to Company C, 65th Infantry Regiment, 3rd Infantry Division and sent to Korea.

The men of the 65th, now attached to the Army's 3d Infantry Division, were among the first infantrymen to meet the enemy on the battlefields of Korea. After November, 1950, they fought daily against units of the Chinese People's Liberation Army after the Chinese entered the war on the North Korean side. One of the hardships suffered by the Puerto Ricans was the lack of warm clothing during the cold and harsh winters. Among the battles and operations in which the 65th participated was Operation Killer in January 1951, becoming the first Regiment to cross the Han River in South Korea during the operation. In April 1951, the Regiment participated in the Uijonbu Corridor drives.

He earned the nickname "One Man Army". On April 19, 1951, Cartagena, "with no regard for his own safety," as the official record states, left his position and charged directly into devastating enemy fire, single-handedly destroying two enemy emplacements on Hill 206 near "Yonch'on," North Korea. After taking out the emplacements, he was knocked to the ground twice by exploding enemy grenades. Nevertheless, he got up and attacked three more times, each time destroying an enemy emplacement until he was wounded. On October 19, 2002, during a ceremony honoring the 65th Infantry, when he was asked about the battle, Cartagena responded that he just hurled back at the Chinese the grenades thrown at him.  He thought that the rest of the squad was behind him, and didn't realize most of them had been wounded and forced to take cover. Later they found 33 dead Chinese in the machine gun and automatic emplacements and they found 15 more dead in the positions he had destroyed on his way up the hill. Cartagena, who had lost a lot of blood, was sent to Taibu in a helicopter and then to Japan to the 128th Station Hospital where he was hospitalized for 62 days. According to 1st Lt. Reinaldo Deliz Santiago: 

Cartagena was awarded the Distinguished Service Cross (DSC) which is the second highest military decoration of the United States Army (second to the Medal of Honor), awarded for extreme gallantry and risk of life in actual combat with an armed enemy force.

Distinguished Service Cross citation

Later years
Cartagena spent 20 years in the Army before retiring as a Sergeant First Class, in 1971. He continued to be an active figure around the 65th Infantry Headquarters in Puerto Rico long after his retirement. He also had family in El Paso, Texas. His family, upon learning of Modesto's actions, had taken it upon themselves to make a request to Congress, that he be awarded the Medal of Honor. They received support on this quest from the Republican Veterans Committee. His supporters argued that the segregation policy of the army, at the time, and the limited English capacity of his company members when filling out the forms for the application, resulted in the awarding of the nations' second highest decoration, the Distinguished Service Cross.

On March 2, 2010, the day that Puerto Rico commemorated the 93rd anniversary of American citizenship, Cartagena died in his home in the town of Guayama, of a heart attack following a long battle with stomach cancer, he is survived by his sisters María and Virginia and his children Modesto Jr., Luis Antonio, Fernando, Sara, Wilma and Víctor. Cartagena was buried with military honors in the Puerto Rico National Cemetery located in the city of Bayamon. While no Federal government representative attended the interment ceremony for this highly decorated veteran, Puerto Rico's second-highest official, Secretary of State Kenneth McClintock attended. He delivered to Cartagena's family a personal letter from Governor Luis Fortuño and stated that while Cartagena was actually being buried with a Distinguished Service Cross, "in our hearts we're sending him off with the Medal of Honor he deserves" and made a commitment to seek it posthumously.

Legacy
January 4, 2007, was officially declared as "SFC Modesto Cartagena Day" in the City of Hartford, Connecticut. The proclamation by Mayor Eddie A. Perez can be viewed here: "SFC Modesto Cartagena Day" Proclamation. An avenue in his native town of Cayey is named after him. On April 14, 2021, USAG Fort Buchanan dedicated the base Visitor Control Center in honor of SFC Modesto Cartagena.

Military awards and decorations

According to a photo published by the New York Times, Cartagena's numerous decorations are the following:

Puerto Rican Legislative Award
  Military Medal of Honor of the Legislative Assembly of Puerto Rico

Foreign decoration
The Bravery Gold Medal of Greece was given by the Government of Greece to the 65th Infantry Regiment and to the members of the regiment who fought in the Korean War.
  Chryssoun Aristion Andrias (Bravery Gold Medal of Greece)

Badges:
  Rifle Marksmanship Badge
 2 Overseas Service Bars
 7 Service stripes
Congressional Gold Medal

On June 10, 2014, President Barack Obama, signed the legislation known as  "The Borinqueneers CGM Bill" at an official ceremony. The Bill honors the 65th Infantry Regiment with the Congressional Gold Medal.

See also

List of Puerto Ricans
List of Puerto Rican military personnel
Puerto Rican recipients of the Distinguished Service Cross

Notes

References

1921 births
2010 deaths
United States Army soldiers
United States Army non-commissioned officers
United States Army personnel of World War II
United States Army personnel of the Korean War
Puerto Rican Army personnel
Recipients of the Silver Star
Recipients of the Legion of Merit
Recipients of the Distinguished Service Cross (United States)
People from Cayey, Puerto Rico